Breast Cancer Now is a charity in the United Kingdom which was formed in 2015 by the merger of Breast Cancer Campaign and Breakthrough Breast Cancer. It is the United Kingdom's largest breast cancer charity. Its declared "Action Plan" is "by 2050, everyone who develops breast cancer will live".

Among other projects the charity provides most of the funding for the Breast Cancer Now Toby Robins Research Centre at the Institute of Cancer Research, London, which employs 120 scientists and clinicians.

The charity's chief executive is Delyth Morgan, Baroness Morgan of Drefelin, and Prince Charles is its patron.

In November 2018 research-focused Breast Cancer Now and support-focused Breast Cancer Care announced that they would merge on 1 April 2019, creating a charity with an income of about £45 million. The merged charity is chaired by Jill Thompson, formerly a trustee of Breast Cancer Care, and the chief executive is Delyth Morgan, formerly chief executive of Breast Cancer Now. The combined headquarters are at Breast Cancer Now offices at Aldgate, London. The charity said that it would operate using both names for about a year, when a new logo and name was expected to be introduced.  the charity's formal name is "Breast Cancer Care and Breast Cancer Now" and it uses the working name "Breast Cancer Now".

Breast Cancer Now's flagship fundraising event is their 'wear it pink' campaign. This is one of the UK's biggest fundraising events having raised over £33 million since it launched in 2002. In 2019, the date for the 'wear it pink' campaign was 18 October.

See also 
 Cancer in the United Kingdom

References

External links

Cancer organisations based in the United Kingdom
Organizations established in 2015
2015 establishments in the United Kingdom
Breast cancer organizations